Itaska Beach is a summer village in Alberta, Canada. It is located on the northwest shore of Pigeon Lake, west of Wetaskiwin.

The name derives from ispâskweyâw (ᐃᐢᐹᐢᑫᐧᔮᐤ), the Cree words for "high trees on the edge of woods".

Demographics 

In the 2016 Census of Population conducted by Statistics Canada, the Summer Village of Itaska Beach had a population of 23 living in 10 of its 78 total private dwellings, a  change from its 2011 population of 20.

See also 
List of communities in Alberta
List of summer villages in Alberta
List of resort villages in Saskatchewan

References

External links 

1953 establishments in Alberta
Edmonton Metropolitan Region
Leduc County
Summer villages in Alberta